Bis(cyclooctadiene)nickel(0) is the organonickel compound with the formula Ni(C8H12)2, also written Ni(cod)2. It is a diamagnetic coordination complex featuring tetrahedral nickel(0) bound to the alkene groups in two 1,5-cyclooctadiene ligands. This highly air-sensitive yellow solid is a common source of Ni(0) in chemical synthesis.

Preparation and properties 
The complex is prepared by reduction of anhydrous nickel(II) acetylacetonate in the presence of the diolefin:
Ni(acac)2  +  2 cod  +  2 AlEt3  →  Ni(cod)2  +  2 acacAlEt2  +  C2H6  +  C2H4
Ni(cod)2 is moderately soluble in several organic solvents.  One or both 1,5-cyclooctadiene ligands are readily displaced by phosphines, phosphites, bipyridine, and isocyanides. If exposed to air, the solid oxidizes to nickel(II) oxide. As a result, this compound is generally handled in a glovebox.

References

Organonickel compounds
Cyclooctadiene complexes